The Cavite Science Integrated School (Filipino: Pambansang Mataas na Paaralang Pang-Agham ng Kabite) formerly known as Cavite National Science High School, is a secondary public science high school located in Garita-B (beside Maragondon Elementary School), Maragondon, Cavite in the Philippines.  It is the Regional Science High School for Region IV-A.

Notes

External links 
Official Website

Science high schools in the Philippines
Regional Science High School Union
High schools in Cavite
Educational institutions established in 1981
1981 establishments in the Philippines